Glennys L. McVeigh is a justice with the Federal Court of Canada. Prior to her appointment on April 26, 2013, she served as a senior counsel with the Public Prosecution Service of Canada in Saskatoon.

References

Judges of the Federal Court of Canada
Living people
Canadian women judges
Year of birth missing (living people)